Jim Rutt (born 1954) is an American businessman and entrepreneur, the former CEO of Network Solutions, and the former chairman of the Santa Fe Institute.

Early life
In 1975, Rutt received a bachelor's degree in management from the Massachusetts Institute of Technology. He later ran technology operations for Thomson Corporation.

Business career
Rutt was the CEO of Network Solutions, an American technology and Internet company. He was hired in 1999 during the dot-com boom, and negotiated the company's $15 billion acquisition by Verisign, where it continued operating as an independent subsidiary. In March 2001, after the acquisition, he subsequently stepped down from his position as a Verisign executive. After retiring, New Mexico governor Bill Richardson appointed Rutt to serve on the State Investment Council. In 2014, Rutt co-founded a makerspace in Staunton, Virginia with software engineer Dan Funk.

Activities
In 1981, Rutt was the first to use the term "snail mail" to describe conventional mail services, in contrast with email. Rutt is a trustee of the Santa Fe Institute, a multi-disciplinary research organization, and was its chairman before retiring in 2012. He does research into the scientific study of consciousness and artificial general intelligence.

He hosts a podcast called The Jim Rutt Show.

References

External links
 The Jim Rutt Show
 Lifeboat Foundation biography

Living people
American computer businesspeople
American technology chief executives
American technology company founders
1954 births
Santa Fe Institute people
MIT Sloan School of Management alumni